The Jeanette State Forest is a state forest located in St. Louis County, Minnesota. The forest is within the limits of the Superior National Forest's Boundary Waters Canoe Area Wilderness, and thus falls under the federal jurisdiction and management of the United States Forest Service. 

Camping is available in the Superior National Forest at the Lake Jeanette Campground. Originally built by the Civilian Conservation Corps in the 1930s, the campground is located in a stand of pine and northern hardwoods overlooking Lake Jeanette.

See also
List of Minnesota state forests

External links
Lake Jeanette State Forest - Minnesota Department of Natural Resources (DNR)

References

Minnesota state forests
Protected areas of St. Louis County, Minnesota
Protected areas established in 1963